The Cornerstone Group is a High Tory or traditional conservative political organisation within the British Conservative Party. The Group espouses traditional values as exemplified by its motto: Faith, Flag, and Family. It comprises Members of Parliament with a traditionalist outlook and was founded in 2005. The Group's president is Edward Leigh and its chairman John Hayes. Many Conservative Party Members of Parliament and Peers belong to the Cornerstone Group, including several members of His Majesty's Government.

The Conservative Party incorporates three main schools of thought; along with the traditionalist-leaning Cornerstone Group, there are also the One Nation and Thatcherite elements. There is more than a degree of overlap between these groups, depending on the issue. The Cornerstone Group supports the unitary governance of the British state and opposes attempts to transfer power away from it — either downwards through regionalism and devolution, or upwards to the international control of the European Union. A manifesto released at the time of its foundation set out the Group's intentions:

The Cornerstone Group appeared to be inactive after the 2019 elections (the source of the Cornerstone "About" page shows a last modified date in 2018); Sir John Hayes's Common Sense Group, launched in 2020 in the wake of Black Lives Matter with about 40 MPs, is said to revive the Cornerstone Group.

Principles
Its name derives from the Cornerstone Group's support for three British social institutions: the Church of England, the unitary British state, and the family. To this end, it emphasises England's Anglican heritage,  opposes any transfer of power away from the central government and institutions of the United Kingdom — either downwards to the nations and regions or upwards to the European Union — and seeks to place greater emphasis on traditional family structures to repair what has been termed as Britain's broken society, as well as calling for lower levels of immigration into the UK.

Its core focus points according to its website include the "monarchy; traditional marriage; family and community duties; proper pride in the United Kingdom's distinctive qualities; quality of life over soulless utility; social responsibility over personal selfishness; social justice as civic duty, not state dependency; compassion for those in need; reducing government waste; lower taxation and deregulation; and promotion and protection of ancient liberties against politically correct censorship and a commitment to the democratically elected UK parliament."

Prominent MPs from this wing of the party include Owen Paterson and John Redwood. Though the group is  marked out by its support for the Anglican Church, it also includes more traditional Catholic members such as Jacob Rees-Mogg and Edward Leigh and Muslims such as Sajid Javid.

Members

MPs, but not peers, listed on the Cornerstone Web site as members as of 20 June 2018.

See also

Bow Group
Traditional Britain Group
Conservative Christian Fellowship

References

External links
The Cornerstone Group
Press release about the founding of the Cornerstone Group 25 July 2005

Political party factions in the United Kingdom
Organisations associated with the Conservative Party (UK)
2005 establishments in the United Kingdom
Right-wing politics in the United Kingdom
Conservative Party (UK) factions